Howard Samuel Meeks Jr. (November 29, 1932 – May 13, 2016) was the sixth bishop of the Episcopal Diocese of Western Michigan between 1984 and 1988.

Early life
Meeks was born on November 29, 1932 in Upland, Pennsylvania, the son of Howard Samuel Meeks and Edith May Flounders. He was educated in Chester High School, graduating in 1951. He then studied at the Goldey–Beacom College from where he earned an Associate’s Degree in Accounting and Business Administration, after which he worked for General Chemical in Claymont, Delaware. He also joined the United States Navy Reserve and was engaged in active duty between 1954 and 1956, serving on the USS Daly where he achieved the rank of Personnelman Petty Officer 3rd Class. After being discharged, Meeks worked for Sun Oil Company in Marcus Hook, Pennsylvania, whilst perusing his studies for the Bachelor’s degree at Pennsylvania Military College. After a while, he enrolled at the Master of Divinity from the Episcopal Divinity School in Philadelphia, graduating with a Master of Divinity in 1962.

Ordained Ministry
Meeks was ordained as a priest in December 1964. He served as assistant rector at St Paul’s Church in Chester, Pennsylvania, the Church of the Holy Trinity in West Chester, Pennsylvania, and St Thomas' Church in Terrace Park, Ohio. He then became rector of the Church of the Nativity in New Castle, Delaware and in 1973, becmae rector of St Andrew’s Church in Fort Pierce, Florida.

Bishop & Resignation
Meeks was elected as the Bishop Coadjutor to the Diocese of Western Michigan in 1984, and was consecrated on October 6, 1984. He then succeeded as diocesan on December 1, 1984. He only served four years as bishop, resigning in January 1988, becoming effective on February 1, 1988. After his resignation, he worked as a representative of Food for the Poor.

Meeks resigned his Holy Orders in the Episcopal Church on December 20, 2007, becoming effective in February 2008. He died in Winter Garden, Florida on May 13, 2016.

References

1932 births
2016 deaths
Episcopal bishops of Western Michigan
20th-century American Episcopalians
Chester High School alumni
Episcopal Divinity School alumni
Widener University alumni
United States Navy reservists
Burials at Arlington National Cemetery
United States Navy non-commissioned officers